North Pole Radio Station is the fourth album by Pram, released in 1998.

Critical reception
The Independent wrote that Pram's "dark playfulness has a woozy ambience which makes this a very friendly oddity indeed." CMJ New Music Monthly called North Pole Radio Station "the band's most skeletal album to date," writing that "for the most part, Pram's newfound economy yields brilliant results."

Track listing

Personnel 
Rosie Cuckston – vocals, keyboards, omnichord
Matt Eaton - guitar, bass guitar, sampler, keyboards
Sam Owen –  bass guitar, guitar, keyboards, accordion, woodwind
Max Simpson – keyboards, sampler
Nick Sales – keyboards, guitar, woodwind, theremin, sampler
Daren Garratt – drums, percussion
Mark Butterworth – drums, percussion

References

External links 
 

1998 albums
Pram (band) albums
Domino Recording Company albums